Horn trio can mean a work written for three horns or horns as well as one for horn and two other instruments. In the latter category, an important genre is the trio for horn, violin and piano. Although there are a few earlier examples, the tradition of this scoring was inaugurated in 1865 by Johannes Brahms with his Trio in E, opus 40. Related combinations are those of (1) oboe, horn, and piano, (2) clarinet, horn, and piano, (3) horn, bassoon, and piano and (4) flute, horn, and piano.

Horn, violin and piano

Horn, oboe and piano

Horn, clarinet and piano

Horn, bassoon and piano

Horn, flute and piano

Chamber music